Brian Lindstrom (born February 12, 1961) is a documentary filmmaker. In 2013, Lindstrom directed Alien Boy: The Life and Death of James Chasse. The film examines the life of a man diagnosed with schizophrenia who died in police custody in Portland, Oregon on September 17, 2006. Alien Boy: the Life and Death of James Chasse is distributed by Breaking Glass Pictures and has been shown at film festivals in the US and Canada. Production on Alien Boy began in 2007 and ended in 2013.

Lindstrom made Finding Normal in 2007, a cinema-verite documentary following three long-term addicts trying to rebuild their lives with the help of peer counselors. Lindstrom made the film in 2007 on a budget of $5,000, shooting and editing himself. Finding Normal won awards at the Astoria International and Longbaugh Film Festivals, and was broadcast on Oregon Public Broadcasting. Finding Normal is the only film ever to be shown to inmates in solitary confinement at Oregon State Penitentiary.

Other films directed by Lindstrom include the documentaries Kicking, To Pay My Way With Stories, and Writing Myself. His award-winning narrative short, Lucy's Room, is adapted from the short story "Surprised by Joy," by Charles Baxter. He was awarded a Telly for work on The Visionaries, a PBS documentary series hosted by Sam Waterston.

Since 1994 Lindstrom has taught in the Northwest Film Center's Young Filmmaker's Program, using video as a tool of empowerment for at-risk youth. He has made many films with youth in Portland, rural Oregon, Texas, Idaho and the South Bronx.

Lindstrom was born and raised in Portland, Oregon, and graduated from Parkrose High School.  He holds an MFA in screenwriting and film directing from Columbia University and as an undergraduate, he attended Lewis & Clark College, receiving a degree in Communications in 1984. He was mentored by retired Lewis & Clark professor Stuart Kaplan, who inspired Lindstrom to pursue a career in film making.

Lindstrom is married to the writer Cheryl Strayed. They have two children and live in Portland, Oregon.

Filmography
 Mothering Inside (2015)
 Alien Boy: The Life and Death of James Chasse (2013)
 To Pay My Way With Stories (2012)
 Writing Myself
 Finding Normal (2007)
 Kicking (2004)

References

External links
 Brian Lindstrom official site
 
 Alien Boy: the Life and Death of James Chasse

Writers from Portland, Oregon
Living people
1961 births
Filmmakers from Portland, Oregon
American documentary film directors
Columbia University School of the Arts alumni
Lewis & Clark College alumni
Parkrose High School alumni